Erg Ferradj is a town and commune in Abadla District, Béchar Province, in western Algeria. According to the 2008 census its population is 4,406, down from 4,670 in 1998, and an annual population growth rate of -0.6%, the second lowest in the province.

Geography

The rocky hills of the hamada are found on both sides of the river, but are more dramatic on the eastern side.

Climate

Erg Ferradj has a hot desert climate, with extremely hot summers and cool winters, and very little precipitation throughout the year.

Economy

Agriculture is the main industry in Erg Ferradj. There are a total of 116,040 date palms planted in the commune. As of 2009 there were 9,575 sheep, 6,050 goats, 714 camels, and 23 cattle. There were also 6,400 chickens in 6 buildings.

There is no significant tourist industry in Erg Ferradj.

Infrastructure and housing

Basic services in the town are generally well provided for. 100% of Erg Ferradj's population is connected to drinking water, 99% is connected to the sewerage system, and 99% (including 756 buildings) have access to electricity. There is no fuel service station in the town.

Erg Ferradj has a total of 1,300 houses, of which 712 are occupied, giving an occupation rate of 6.2 inhabitants per occupied building.

Transportation

Erg Ferradj is reached by a local road from the N6 highway just west of Abadla.

Education

There are 3 elementary schools, with 39 classrooms including 27 in use. There are a total of 1,096 school students.

2.8% of the population has a tertiary education, and another 14.9% has competed secondary education. The overall literacy rate is 71.3%, and is 77.2% among males and 65.3% among females.

Health

Erg Ferradj has 2 polyclinics and 2 room care facilities; residents must travel to Abadla or Méchraâ Houari Boumédienne for further medical treatment.

Religion

Erg Ferradj has 3 operational mosques, with another 1 under construction.

Localities
The commune is composed of three localities:

Erg Ferradj
Guir Lotfi
Hassi Menounat

References

Neighbouring towns and cities

Communes of Béchar Province
Béchar Province